San Clemente Naval Auxiliary Air Station is a closed airfield located near the center of the San Clemente Island, California. Also called San Clemente Airfield, the airfield was built in 1934 with two 1,600-foot dirt runways. San Clemente Island is owned and operated by the United States Navy since November 7, 1934. The Works Progress Administration and a civilian contractor improved the airfield in 1938. The two runways were rebuilt to paved at 3,000-feet and 2,000 feet long by the WPA. The WPA also built a new hangar at the base. The airfield became a US  Marines training base with the start of World War 2. A Marines squadron was station at Airfield and began air scouting training in 1942. The Marines trained in 19 Vought SB2U Vindicator carcraft and a one Grumman J2F Duck seaplane.  The US Army installed two radar stations nearby and the runways were improved in 1941, the 3,000-foot runway was made into a 5,000-foot runway. In 1943 the airfield was renamed Naval Auxiliary Air Facility San Clemente Island. The Airfield supported bomb testing, radar training, Naval fighter gunnery training, and electronic countermeasures on the Island during the war.  Over the years the size and scope of the airfield deduced, by 1977 the 2,000-foot runways was removed, and the east/west 5,000-foot runway was used rarely and closed at times. The deduced airfield was sometimes used for training in amphibious and air assault operational, also UAV operations. Today the runways as two helipads on the old runway. Naval Auxiliary Landing Field San Clemente Island became the main active Airfield.

See also

California during World War II
American Theater (1939–1945)
United States home front during World War II
DeWitt General Hospital
Ground Equipment Facility J-36A

References 

San Clemente Naval Auxiliary Air Station
Installations of the United States Navy in California
San Clemente Naval Auxiliary Air Station
Closed installations of the United States Navy